Live at Carnegie Hall is a 2012 collaborative album recorded by Brazilian artist Caetano Veloso and Scottish-American alternative rock musician David Byrne at New York City's Carnegie Hall as a part of their 2004 Perspectives series. Veloso was invited to curate a performance and he invited Byrne, who in turn performed a solo set of his own as well as collaborative work between them. The album was released on Nonesuch Records on March 12, 2012.

Track listing
Caetano Veloso
"Desde Que o Samba é Samba" (Caetano Veloso) – 4:47
"Você é Linda" (Veloso) – 4:09
"Sampa" (Veloso) – 3:53
"O Leãozinho" (Veloso) – 3:05
"Coração Vagabundo" (Veloso) – 2:55
"Manhatã" (Veloso) – 4:10

David Byrne
"The Revolution" (David Byrne) – 2:31
"Everyone's in Love with You" (Byrne) – 1:51
"And She Was" (Byrne) – 3:57
"She Only Sleeps" (Byrne) – 3:22
"Life During Wartime" (Byrne, Chris Frantz, Jerry Harrison, and Tina Weymouth) – 4:20
"God's Child" (Byrne) – 4:27
"Road to Nowhere" (Byrne) – 3:44

Byrne and Veloso
"Dreamworld: Marco de Canaveses" (Byrne and Veloso) – 4:55
"Um Canto de Afoxé para o Bloco de Ilê" (Caetano Veloso and Moreno Veloso) – 3:35
"(Nothing But) Flowers" (Byrne, Frantz, Harrison, Yves N'Jock, and Weymouth) – 4:59
"Terra" (Veloso) – 5:54
"Heaven" (Byrne) – 3:56

Personnel
David Byrne – vocals and acoustic guitar
Caetano Veloso – vocals and acoustic guitar

Additional musicians
Jaques Morelenbaum – cello
Mauro Refosco – percussion

Technical personnel
Caetano Veloso and David Byrne – production
Robert Hurwitz – executive producer
Tom Lazarus – recording and mixing
Robert Ludwig at Gateway Mastering Studios, Portland, Maine, United States – mastering
John Gall – design
Chris Lee – photography

References

External links
Page from Nonesuch
Live at Carnegie Hall from DavidByrne.com

2012 live albums
Collaborative albums
David Byrne live albums
Caetano Veloso live albums
Albums recorded at Carnegie Hall
Nonesuch Records live albums
Albums produced by David Byrne
Portuguese-language live albums